Haradhan Bandopadhyay (6 November 1926 – 5 January 2013) was a Bengali Indian male actor of television and films. He made his debut in the 1948 Bengali film Devdut, directed by Atanu Bandopadhyay. He worked with some of the most prominent directors of Bengali cinema, like Satyajit Ray and Mrinal Sen.

Early life
Bandopadhyay started his schooling from Kushtia Municipal School in East Bengal, now Bangladesh. He passed matriculation in 1944. In 1946, he finished his IA exam from City College, Kolkata, an affiliate of the University of Calcutta. He worked in Gun & Shell factory. In 1946, he joined The Oriental Insurance Company Limited, and he continued there until his retirement . He was even sent to jail for his involvement in the freedom struggle movement of India.

Career
He made his debut in director Atanu Bandopadhay's film Devdut in 1948. He was a celebrated stage artiste who acted in hundreds of plays, working with famous names like Ahindra Choudhury, Chhabi Biswas and Utpal Dutt.

Death
Bandopadhyay died on 5 January 2013 at the age of 86. He had developed pneumonia and was admitted to hospital 15 days before his death. Bandopadhyay is survived by his wife and two sons. After his death, Bengali film actors Paran Bandopadhyay and Soumitra Chatterjee said that his death was a great loss for the Bengali film industry. Another Bengali director, Srijit Mukherji, stated: "I'm devastated by his death... The embodiment of affection passes away."

Selected filmography

 Michael Madhusudhan (1950) as David Hare
 Barjatri (1951)
 Pandit Mashai (1951)
 Niyoti (1951)
 Mriter Marte Agaman (1959)
 Megh (1959)
 Bhagini Nivedita (1962)
 Mahanagar (1963) as Himangshu Mukherjee
 Barnali (1963) as S.P.Mukherjee - General Manager
 Momer Alo (1964) as Ananta Chatterjee
 Ghoom Bhangar Gaan (1965)
 Kapurush (1965) as Bimal Gupta
 Akash Kusum (1965) as Monica's father
 Antony Firingee (1967) as Kelly Antony
 Kheya (1967)
 Chhotto Jignasa (1968)
 Chowringhee (1968) as Jimmy
 Aparachita (1969)
 Deshbandhu Chittaranjan (1970)
 Seemabaddha (1971) as Talukdar
 Nishachar (1971)
 Chinna Patra (1972)
 Padi Pishir Barmi Baksha (1972)
 Sonar Khancha (1973)
 Nani Gopaler Biye (1973)
 Jadi Jantem (1974) as Government lawyer
 Devi Chaudhurani (1974)
 Sonar Kella (1974) as Tapesh's father, Felu's uncle
 Asati (1974)
 Nagar Darpane (1975)
 Chorus (1975) as Committee Member
 Raag Anurag (1975) as Mr. Dutt
 Priyo Bandhabi (1975)
 Seyi Chokh (1976)
 Hotel Snow Fox (1976)
 Nidhiram Sardar (1976)
 Sudur Niharika (1976) - Dr. Arunendu Sen
 Joi Baba Felunath (1979) - Umanath Ghoshal
 Jharh (1979)
 Dadar Kirti (1980) - Kedar's father
 Ogo Bodhu Shundori (1981) - Loola Bose's Husband
 Father (1981)
 Jawalaa Dahej Ki (1982) - Haradhan Banerjee
 Pratiksha (1982)
 Jake Ghoosh Dite Hoy (1982)
 Sansarer Itikatha (1983)
 Agamikal (1983)
 Phatik Chand (1983) - Saradindu Sanyal, Advocate / father of Phatik Chand / Bablu / Nikhil Sanyal
 Din Jai (1983)
 Aparupa (1983)
 Lal Golap (1984)
 Agni Shuddhi (1984)
 Dujane (1984)
 Pratigna (1985)
 Shyam Saheb (1986)
 Shapmukti (1986)
 Pathbhola (1986) as Radhabinode Babu
 Mangaldip (1989)
 Pronami Tomai (1989)
 Mangal Deep (1989)
 Kari Diye Kinlam (1989)
 Amar Prem (1989)
 Aakrosh (1989) as Mili's father, Police Officer
 Shakha Proshakha (1990) as Probodh
 Papi (1990)
 Neelimay Neel (1991)
 Sadharan Meye (1991)
 Goopy Bagha Phire Elo (1991) as King of Anandapur
 Surer Bhubane (1992)
 Shet Patharer Thala (1992) as Bandana's Father-in-Law
 Mayabini (1992)
 Pratham Dekha (1992)
 Duranta Prem (1993)
 Rajar Raja (1994)
 Dhusar Godhuli (1994)
 Bhalobasar Ashroy (1994)
 Sansar Sangram (1995)
 Baksha Rahasya (1966) as Dinanath Lahiri
 Puja (1996)
 Lathi (1996)
 Baro Bou (1997) as Haradhan Bandyopadhyay
 Lal Darja (1997)
 Neoti (1999)
 Jibon Niye Khela (1999) as Dr.Sen
 Madhur Milan (2000)
 Dekha (2001) as Sarama's father
 Swapner Feriwala (2002)  as Turni's grandfather
 Adorini (2003) as Boren / Dadubhai
 Parineeta (2005) as Chatterjee
 Krantikaal (2005) as Zamindar
 Anuranan (2006) as Mr. Sen 'Colonel'
 Kailashe Kelenkari (2008) as Sidhu Jyatha
 Chander Bari (2007)
 Khela (2008)
 Josh (2010) - Indra's Grandpa
 Ogo Bodhu Sundari (2010)
 Lajja -The Shame (2010)
 Gorosthaney Sabdhan (2010) as Sidhu Jyatha
 Shotru (2011) as Dadu
 8:08 Er Bongaon Local (2012) as Doctor
 Barfi! (2012) as Daaju
 Khoka 420 (2013) as dadubhai (final film role)

Awards
 Best Stage artist award by Ulto Rath Magazine [1961]
 National Film Award for Best Supporting Actor [2005]
 Banga Bibhushan by Government of West Bengal [2011]
 Kalakar Awards

References

External links

1926 births
2013 deaths
Bengali male actors
Male actors in Bengali cinema
Best Supporting Actor National Film Award winners
City College, Kolkata alumni
University of Calcutta alumni
Indian male television actors
Kalakar Awards winners
Indian male actors